Autosticha enervata is a moth in the family Autostichidae. It was described by Edward Meyrick in 1929. It is found in Assam, India.

The wingspan is 11–13 mm. The forewings are ochreous whitish or whitish ochreous, sometimes rather speckled fuscous posteriorly. There are very small blackish dots on the base of the costa and dorsum, and in the middle near the base. The stigmata are blackish, the plical obliquely before the first discal, the second discal rather large. There is a marginal series of rather elongate dark fuscous dots around the posterior half of the costa and termen. The hindwings are light grey.

References

Moths described in 1929
Autosticha
Moths of Asia